Saha District is a gu in western Busan, South Korea. It has an area of 40.89 km², and a population of about 375,000. About a third of the area is forest land. Saha-gu became a gu of Busan in 1983. It is home to the Seunghak Campus of Dong-A University.

Administrative divisions

Saha-gu is divided into 8 legal dong, which all together comprise 16 administrative dong, as follows:

Goejeong-dong (4 administrative dong)
Dangni-dong
Hadan-dong (2 administrative dong)
Sinpyeong-dong (2 administrative dong)
Jangnim-dong (2 administrative dong)
Dadae-dong (2 administrative dong)
Gupyeong-dong
Gamcheon-dong (2 administrative dong)

Sister cities
 Dongli, China

See also
Busan
Geography of South Korea

References

External links

Saha-gu-City of Busan 
Saha-gu website 

 
Districts of Busan